Kirill Nikolayevich Orekhov (born 27 January 1999) is a Russian football player who most recently played for Ida-Virumaa FC Alliance.

References

External links

1999 births
Living people
Russian footballers
Association football midfielders
Russian expatriate footballers
Expatriate footballers in Belarus
FC Spartak Moscow players
FC Arsenal Tula players
FC Torpedo Minsk players
Belarusian Premier League players
Ida-Virumaa FC Alliance players
Expatriate footballers in Estonia
Sportspeople from Oryol
Russian expatriate sportspeople in Belarus
Russian expatriate sportspeople in Estonia